Mohammad Mohsin (1942–2003) was an Indian director and actor.

Mohammad Mohsin may also refer to:

 Mohammad Mohsin (cricketer, born 1993), Pakistani cricketer
 Mohammad Mohsin (cricketer, born 1996), Pakistani cricketer
 Mohammad Mohsin (politician), politician